Stan Kann (December 9, 1924 – September 29, 2008) received national recognition in the 1960s when he was a frequent guest on The Tonight Show and daytime television talk shows, showcasing his collection of vacuum cleaners. Kann also was known among theatre organ aficionados for his 22-year tenure as resident organist at the Fox Theatre in St. Louis, Missouri.

Organist
Kann, a native of St. Louis, began playing the organ at age 4. He majored in classical organ at Washington University in St. Louis. In the late 1940s, he persuaded the management of the Fox Theatre in St Louis to allow him to refurbish its 4-36 Fox Special Wurlitzer, which had lain idle for twenty years, and became the official house organist in 1952. Kann served as the theater's resident organist until 1974, four years before the Fox closed. In 1956, Kann installed a Wurlitzer in the famous St. Louis restaurant "Ruggeri's On The Hill" (later owned by Stan Musial) and played there regularly until 1974. His Saturday evening performances at Ruggeri's were broadcast on NBC from 1964 to 1974.

Talk show guest
Kann's first appearance on The Tonight Show was June 8, 1966. He had been booked to discuss some of the prized carpet sweepers from his 150-item collection."I planned on showing the vacuums as a kind of historical demonstration. I had no idea what it would turn into," Kann told a reporter for the St. Louis Post-Dispatch.

Once Kann began demonstrating the sweepers on air, parts began to fall off the vacuum cleaners at inopportune moments. Tonight Show host Johnny Carson saved the situation with humorous ad libs, and Kann was  invited to make 76 additional appearances on The Tonight Show. 
Kann had been introduced to Carson through Phyllis Diller. He met Diller when she made a guest appearance on The Charlotte Peters Show, a local St. Louis television program. Kann served as musical director and co-host on the show, and Diller was impressed by Kann's wit.  "When she saw my vacuum (collection) she said, 'I'm going to call the Carson show, cause you're nuts,'" Kann said in an Associated Press interview.

Kann also made 89 appearances on The Mike Douglas Show and was a guest on talk shows hosted by Merv Griffin and Gypsy Rose Lee.

Biography
Kann became interested in vacuum cleaners at age 8. His interest primarily stemmed from the fact that his parents couldn't afford to buy one. 
Kann developed the ability to distinguish different models of vacuum cleaners by sound. If, while walking down the street, he heard a cleaner he didn't recognize, he had no qualms about knocking on the door and asking to see the sweeper. "Sometimes they'd say yes, and sometimes they'd say no," Kann told the Post-Dispatch interviewer. He briefly worked as a vacuum cleaner salesman in high school. 
Kann moved from Missouri to Los Angeles in 1975, but returned to St. Louis in 1998 for hip replacement surgery.

Kann died at Saint Louis University Hospital of complications from open heart surgery.

Select discography
The Pipes Of Stan – Norman Records – LP catalog # NS 213 – 1966
Stan Kann In St Louis – Malar Productions – LP catalog # MAS 2018 – 1972
Anything Goes – Piping Hot Productions – CD catalog # 1001 – 1996
Pipe Organ Extravaganza 2 – Rialto Square Theatre – CD catalog # N/A – 1997
Stan Kann At Dickenson – Dickenson Theatre Organ Society – CD catalog # 121 – 2001
Meet Me At The Fox – Kann Productions – CD catalog # N/A – 2003
Pipes And Power – Kann Productions – CD catalog # N/A
Christmas With Stan Kann – Kann Productions – cassette catalog # N/A

References

External links
 Stan Kann's web site
  Video of the Fox Theater organ and Stan Kann assembled by local PBS station KETC
  Video of Stan Kann & His Vacuum Collection

1924 births
2008 deaths
American male organists
Washington University in St. Louis alumni
Musicians from St. Louis
Vacuum cleaners
Theatre organists
20th-century American musicians
20th-century American male musicians
American organists